The Big World of Little Adam was a series of television cartoons that debuted in syndication in 1964.

In the early 1960s, producer Fred Ladd acquired a large number of NASA documentary short subjects and packaged them as 110 five-minute episodes.  Inexpensive animated wraparounds, featuring the inquisitive Little Adam and his younger brother Wilbur, were added to open and close the segments.

The episodes were made available in syndication either as half-hour blocks or individually, often appearing interspersed within blocks of cartoons on local TV stations. The early 60s shorts became outdated after the Apollo 11 moon landing in 1969, and the show fell out of syndication by the early 1970s.

Little Adam's voice was performed by John Megna; Wilbur was played by Craig Sechler.

Partial list of episodes

Aerospace Ship
A Far-Away Cry
Aim for the Stars
Aim for the Sun
Blueprints from Space
Breathing in Space
Echo in Space
Flying the Blizzard
Gemini: The Space Twins
How Not to Fly to Venus
Kitty Hawk to Mars
Man in a Spacesuit
Man on the Moon
Mercury in Orbit
Mercury Man in Space
Missing Spaceman
OAO-Telescope in Space
Our Wandering Planet
Pictures from Space
Recovery at Sea
Star Glazers
The Amazing Maser
The Dust Storm
The Flaming Re-entry
The Highest Wind
The Middle Ear
The Space Tug
The World Tomorrow
To Take the Moon
Track of the Capsule
Voice from Space
Voices from the Moon
War of the Satellites
What Scares You
Zero Gravity
Zero Plus Five!

References

1960s American animated television series
1964 American television series debuts
American children's animated adventure television series
First-run syndicated television programs in the United States

Year of television series ending missing